A gubernatorial election was held on 31 August 2014 to elect the next governor of , a prefecture of Japan located in the north of the Shikoku island.

Candidates 

Keizo Hamada, 62, incumbent since 2010, former Finance Ministry bureaucrat. He was supported by LDP, New Komeito, SDP and the local chapter of DPJ. 
Tadashi Kawamura, 55, secretary general of JCP prefectural committee.

Results

References 

2014 elections in Japan
Kagawa gubernational elections
Politics of Kagawa Prefecture